Orestias ascotanensis is a species of freshwater ray-finned fish within the family Cyprinodontidae, endemic to 12 springs in the Ascotán Salt Flat in Chile. It grows to a length of 7.5 centimeters.

References 

Fish described in 1984
ascotanensis
Freshwater fish of Chile